The following is a list of notable events and releases of the year 1967 in Norwegian music.

Events

May
 The 15th Bergen International Festival started in Bergen, Norway.

June
 The 4th Kongsberg Jazz Festival started in Kongsberg, Norway.

July
 The 7th Moldejazz started in Molde, Norway.

Albums released

Unknown date

G
 Jan Garbarek Trio & Quartet
 Til Vigdis (Norsk Jazzforbund)

Deaths

 November
 25 –  Johannes Hanssen, bandmaster, composer and teacher.

Births

 February
 1 – John Hegre, guitarist, songwriter and sound engineer.
 3
 Børge Petersen-Øverleir, jazz and rock guitarist.
 Gisle Kverndokk, contemporary composer.
 12 – Stein Inge Brækhus, jazz drummer and record producer
 22 – Audun Erlien, jazz bassist, guitarist, and electronica performer.
 26 – Audun Skorgen, jazz bassist.

 March
 9 – Siri Broch Johansen, Sami author and singer.
 13 – Håkon Storm-Mathisen, jazz guitarist and composer.
 31 – Ivar Kolve, jazz vibraphonist, percussionist, and composer.

 April
 1 – Dag Stokke, keyboardist in the band TNT, church organist and mastering engineer, cancer (died 2011).
 8 – Margit Bakken, vocalist, guitarist, and songwriter.
 14 – Frode Unneland, drummer and multi-instrumentalist.
 24 – Magnus Grønneberg, vocalist (CC Cowboys).

 May
 18 – Svein Folkvord, jazz double bassist, sound engineer, and composer.

 July
 27 – Hans Mathisen, jazz guitarist and composer.

 August
 11 – Petter Wettre, jazz saxophonist and composer.

See also
 1967 in Norway
 Music of Norway
 Norway in the Eurovision Song Contest 1967

References

 
Norwegian music
Norwegian
Music
1960s in Norwegian music